Abdullah bin Hamad Al Attiyah (born 1952) is the former deputy prime minister of Qatar and the head of the Emir's court. From September 1992 to January 2011, Attiyah was Qatar's Minister of Energy and Industry.

Early life and education
Attiyah was born in Qatar 1952. In 1976, he graduated from the University of Alexandria, Egypt with a bachelor's degree.

Career

Politics 
Attiyah started his career in 1972 with the ministry of finance and petroleum of Qatar. From 1973 to 1986, he held a post of the head of international and public relations at the ministry. From 1986 to 1989, he served as the director of the office of the minister, and from 1989 to 1992, as the director of the office of the minister of interior and as the acting minister of finance and petroleum.

On 23 November 1993, Attiyah was named OPEC president and a member of the OPEC's quota compliance committee.

On 12 January 1999, he also assumed the responsibility for  electricity and water issues as these sectors were merged into the ministry of energy and industry.  On 16 September 2003 he was appointed second deputy prime minister and on 3 April 2007, deputy prime minister.

In December 2003, he chaired the OPEC's annual conference in Vienna, Austria, and served as head of Qatar's delegation.

On 30 June 2009, at the eight ministerial meeting of the Gas Exporting Countries Forum in Doha, Attiyah was elected as the chairman of the organization. Although Gas Exporting Countries Forum has seen by some experts as an attempt to form 'gas-OPEC',  Attiyah ruled out a creation of OPEC-like cartel.

On 18 January 2011 he was named head of the Amiri Diwan while remaining in the post of the deputy prime minister. In the post of minister of industry and energy he was replaced by Mohammed Saleh Al Sada.

In 2011, Attiyah was appointed head of former Emir Hamad Al Thani's office and president of the Qatar Administrative 
Control and Transparency Authority.

During the 2012 United Nations Climate Change Conference in Doha, Attiyah served as the chairman.

Business 
Since 1975, Attiyah has been the director of the Gulf Helicopters Corporation. From 1987 to 1995, he served as the deputy chairman of QTel. Since 1986, he has been member of the directors board of Gulf Airways Corporation.

In 1992, Attiyah was appointed as chairman and managing director of Qatar Petroleum.
Attiyah is also President of the Board of Trustees of the Lebanese School of Qatar.

Philanthropy 
Attiyah is chairman of the board of trustees of the Abdullah bin Hamad Al Attiyah International Foundation for Energy and Sustainable Development.

Awards
In 2007, London-based the British Petroleum Intelligence Bulletin chose Attiyah as the Man of the Year in the field of development of hydrocarbon industry.

In 2011, Texas A&M University awarded Attiyah with an Honorary Degree.

Personal life
Attiyah is married and has six children. His interests are reading, fishing and radio communications. His amateur radio call-sign is A71AU.

References

1952 births
Living people
Alexandria University alumni
People in the petroleum industry
Energy ministers of Qatar
Finance ministers of Qatar
Government ministers of Qatar
Industry ministers of Qatar
Mining ministers of Qatar
Deputy Prime Minister of Qatar